Korikossa d'Atakpamé is a Togolese football, or soccer, club based in Atakpamé. They play in the two division in Togolese football, the Togolese Championnat League 2.

The club played in the 2004/05 Togolese Cup.

Stadium 
The club plays their home matches at Guanha Usdao Pesihu, which has a maximum capacity of 4,000 people

Guanha Usdao Pesihu  is a stadium]in Atakpamé, Togo. It is currently used mostly for football matches, is the home stadium of Korikossa Atakpame.

External links 

Football clubs in Togo